Gold-198 (198Au) is a radioactive isotope of gold. It undergoes beta decay to stable 198Hg with a half-life of 2.69464 days.

The decay properties of 198Au have led to widespread interest in its potential use in radiotherapy for cancer treatments. This isotope has also found use in nuclear weapons research and as a radioactive tracer in hydrological research.

Discovery
198Au was possibly observed for the first time in 1935 by Enrico Fermi et al., though it was not correctly identified at the time. This isotope was conclusively identified in 1937 following neutron irradiation of stable 197Au and was ascribed a half-life of approximately 2.7 days.

Applications

Nuclear medicine 
198Au is used for radiotherapy in some cancer treatments.
Its half-life and beta decay energy are favorable for use in medicine because its 4 mm penetration range in tissue allows it to destroy tumors without nearby non-cancerous tissue being affected by radiation. For this reason, 198Au nanoparticles are being investigated as an injectable treatment for prostate cancer.

Radioactive tracing
Sediment and water flow can be investigated using radioactive tracers such as 198Au. This has been used extensively since artificial radioisotopes became available in the 1950s, as a supplement to millennia of investigations using other tracing techniques.

Inside coker units at oil refineries, 198Au is used to study the hydrodynamic behavior of solids in fluidized beds and can also be used to quantify the degree of fouling of bed internals.

Nuclear weapons
Gold has been proposed as a material for creating a salted nuclear weapon (cobalt is another, better-known salting material). A jacket of natural  (the only stable gold isotope), irradiated by the intense high-energy neutron flux from an exploding thermonuclear weapon, would transmute into the radioactive isotope 198Au with a half-life of 2.697 days and produce approximately 0.411 MeV of gamma radiation, significantly increasing the radioactivity of the weapon's fallout for several days. Such a weapon is not known to have ever been built, tested, or used.

The highest amount of 198Au detected in any United States nuclear test was in shot "Sedan" detonated at Nevada Test Site on July 6, 1962.

See also
 Isotopes of gold

References

Gold-198
Medical isotopes